Grias multinervia is a species of rainforest tree in the Monkeypot Family Lecythidaceae. It is found in Colombia and Ecuador.  It is noteworthy for two things: Its very large seeds are up to three inches (77 mm) long by up to  1.17 inches (30 mm) wide.  It also has very large leaves, up to 4' 9" (145 cm) long by up to 14 inches ( 35 cm) wide.

References

multinervia
Flora of Colombia
Flora of Ecuador
Vulnerable plants
Taxonomy articles created by Polbot